FCS-1 was a Japanese ship gun fire-control system (GFCS).

History
In the 1950s, the Japan Maritime Self-Defense Force (JMSDF) used Mk 57 and Mk 63 as its main GFCS, but they were becoming obsolete. JMSDF was eager to introduce automated GFCS that supported automatic radar tracking, such as the American Mk 56, but it was rejected by the US Navy. Under the FY1955 program, a budget for purchasing one automated FCS overseas was approved. It was used for testing and research.

Based on the results, the  began development of a domestic GFCS. This system got a good result and was titled Type 68.

Design
The prototype used a combination of unmanned radar director and manned electro-optical director, and was capable of track while scan (TWS). These two directors were integrated into one manned director as American Mk 56. TWS capability was omitted in the mass-production models.

An electromechanical analog computer was used for fire-control. In the mass-production models, transistors were introduced for their radar and computer (replacing vacuum tubes). The prototype model measured the angular velocity of the line of sight by gyroscopic means (relative-rate) systems, and in the mass-production models, linear-rate systems were introduced.

The two sub-types were: FCS-1A for 5-inch guns and FCS-1B for 3-inch guns.

Operators 
 
 FCS-1A
 
 
 
  (earlier batch)
 FCS-1B
  (latter batch)
  (latter batch)

References

Bibliography

External links 

Military radars of Japan
Naval radars
Military equipment introduced in the 1970s